Cold flow may refer to:
 Creep (deformation) in solids.
 Cold-flow properties in diesel and similar fluids.
 Cold flows (Cosmology) which feed the growth of early galactic objects such as black holes.